Addo Kazianka (born 16 February 1936) is an Italian racing cyclist. He won stage 12 of the 1960 Giro d'Italia.

References

External links
 

1936 births
Living people
Italian male cyclists
Italian Giro d'Italia stage winners
Place of birth missing (living people)
Cyclists from the Province of Monza e Brianza